Andrew John Woodman (born 11 August 1971) is an English football manager and former player, who played as a goalkeeper. He is currently manager of Vanarama National League club Bromley. 

Woodman made league appearances for 10 clubs in England during his playing career. Following his retirement, aside from his managerial career, he has been a goalkeeping coach at several Premier League clubs, including Newcastle United, West Ham United, Crystal Palace, and Arsenal.

Playing career
Woodman spent the first five years of his career playing at Crystal Palace without making a first team appearance. In 1994, he moved to Exeter City making his debut at Lincoln City on the opening day of the season, but his time at St. James' Park was cut short following red cards in two successive matches. He was first sent off against Leyton Orient for violent conduct and then a week later for deliberate handball against Colchester United in the FA Cup. In both games, Woodman was replaced by 15-year old substitute Ross Bellotti, who remains the youngest goalkeeper ever to appear in the football league or FA Cup proper. 

Woodman moved to Northampton Town in March 1995 where he is regarded as something of a cult figure, being granted a testimonial by the club in summer 2007. He was loaned to Brentford in January 1999 and then moved there on a free transfer. After loans spells at Southend United and Colchester United in 2000, he signed permanently for Colchester United for the start of the 2001–02 season. Woodman found himself loaned out again, this time to Oxford United in January 2002, before signing permanently for them when the loan ended in March. Woodman was released by Oxford United in 2004 and then played for Stevenage Borough, Redbridge and Thurrock. His final match for Thurrock was a 4-2 Conference South play-off defeat against Eastbourne Borough on 3 May 2005.  Woodman then briefly returned to the Football League with Rushden & Diamonds, making the final appearance of his career in a 2–1 defeat at Barnet on 29 October 2005.

Coaching career

Coaching
In spring of 2006 he was appointed assistant manager at Rushden & Diamonds but left the club after they were relegated from the Football League at the end of that season to join his former teammate Alan Pardew at West Ham United as a coach. When Pardew moved to Charlton Athletic, Woodman followed him in the summer of 2007 as goalkeeping coach. In December 2010 he linked up with Pardew again at Newcastle United as goalkeeping coach and on 31 July 2015, he joined Crystal Palace in the same position to work under Pardew again. On 9 January 2017, following Pardew's departure and the appointment of Sam Allardyce as manager of Crystal Palace, it was announced that Woodman had left the club.

Management

Whitehawk 
Woodman was appointed to his first managerial role on 1 February 2017 at National League South Whitehawk. He left the club later that year after ensuring National League South safety.

Bromley 
On 29 March 2021, he left his position as Head of Goalkeeping at Arsenal and was appointed as the new manager of National League club Bromley. After guiding the club to the play-offs on the final day of the season, Woodman was awarded the league's Manager of the Month award for May 2021.

On 18 January 2022, Bromley announced that they had received an official approach from League One side Gillingham for permission to speak to Woodman regarding their managerial vacancy. Bromley went on to say that permission had been granted for both parties to speak. On 30 January Bromley announced that Woodman would stay on as manager after turning down the approach from Gillingham.

Woodman won his first trophy as a manager, the FA Trophy, in May 2022.

Personal life

Woodman's son, Freddie, is a goalkeeper with Preston North End. Gareth Southgate is Freddie's godfather.

Woodman co-authored a book Woody & Nord: A Football Friendship with England manager Gareth Southgate about their close friendship which grew from their time together as youth players at Crystal Palace, followed by their wildly differing fortunes in the professional game. Southgate's nickname Nord was given to him by Wally Downes, who thought he sounded like Denis Norden. The book won the best sports autobiography category at the 2004 British Sports Book Awards.

Managerial statistics

Honours

Player
Northampton Town
 Football League Third Division play-offs (1): 1997

Brentford
 Football League Third Division Winner (1): 1998–99

Manager
Bromley
FA Trophy: 2021–22

Individual
National League Manager of the Month: May 2021

References

External links
Profile at UpThePosh! The Peterborough United Database

1971 births
Living people
English footballers
Crystal Palace F.C. players
Exeter City F.C. players
Northampton Town F.C. players
Brentford F.C. players
Peterborough United F.C. players
Southend United F.C. players
Colchester United F.C. players
Oxford United F.C. players
Stevenage F.C. players
Thurrock F.C. players
Redbridge F.C. players
Rushden & Diamonds F.C. players
Footballers from Camberwell
English Football League players
Association football goalkeepers
West Ham United F.C. non-playing staff
Charlton Athletic F.C. non-playing staff
Newcastle United F.C. non-playing staff
Crystal Palace F.C. non-playing staff
Arsenal F.C. non-playing staff
Whitehawk F.C. managers
Bromley F.C. managers
English football managers
Association football coaches
Association football goalkeeping coaches